Ye Ko Oo (born 20 August 1994) is a Burmese footballer who plays as a midfielder for Yadanarbon in Myanmar National League. He played for silver medalist Myanmar U23 at the 2015 SEA Games. He has also participated in matches at the 2010 AFC President's Cup, 2011 AFC President's Cup, and 2015 AFC Cup with his club Yadanarbon FC.

International goals
Scores and results are list Myanmar's goal tally first.

References 

1994 births
Living people
Burmese footballers
Myanmar international footballers
Yadanarbon F.C. players
Association football midfielders
Southeast Asian Games silver medalists for Myanmar
Southeast Asian Games medalists in football
Competitors at the 2015 Southeast Asian Games